Eric Vandenberg (born May 11, 1977) is an American guitarist. He is best known for being in the bands Venus Meadow as well as a solo-artist, focussing on instrumental guitar-music. He also has written an instructional method for guitarists and is an endorsing artist for Ibanez and D'Addario

Biography
Eric Vandenberg picked up the guitar at age 10, first teaching himself, then taking lessons from a local guitarist. Eventually, he attended the GIT (Guitar Institute Of Technology) in 1995.

In 2004, he released his first, instrumental solo-album "Hidden Creek"

After graduating, he worked as a session-musician in both Atlanta and New York City before moving to Germany. There, he began teaching and eventually published his instructional method, "Talking Hands - A Guide To Contemporary Lead-Guitar Techniques" in 2006. The same year, he also became a contributing editor for the German magazine "Guitar", writing reviews of guitars and amplifiers, as well as two instructional columns, "Talking Hands" and "Cranked". For this magazine, he also has conducted interviews and workshops with artists such as Zakk Wylde, Joe Satriani, George Lynch, Tosin Abasi, Paul Gilbert and others.

In 2008, he joined the symphonic metal band Venus Meadow and has been performing live with them, as well as contributing guitars to their debut-album in 2013. He also became an endorser for Dean guitars the same year, performing clinics and workshops for them.

In 2013, he ended his collaboration with Dean and became an endorser for Ibanez guitars and D'Addario strings. The same year, he also started working on his next solo-album, announced to be released in late 2014.

Influences and style
After being initially influenced especially by Edward Van Halen, David Gilmour and Jeff Beck, he mentions Andy Timmons, Jimi Hendrix, Eric Johnson, Paul Gilbert, Joe Satriani as important influences.

His solo-work features lead-guitar techniques such as legato, alternate-picking, sweep-picking and tapping, which he also wrote about in his book and columns.

Gear
In 2014, besides being an endorser for Ibanez and D'Addario, he also endorses Exodus amplifiers and Zoom effects. He uses several different six- and seven-string Ibanez guitars (including an RG and a JEM), three custom-made Exodus tube-amplifiers, as well as effect pedals by the aforementioned companies.

References

External links
 Official website

1977 births
Living people
American heavy metal guitarists
Lead guitarists
Musicians from Atlanta
Musicians Institute alumni
Guitarists from Georgia (U.S. state)
American male guitarists
21st-century American guitarists
21st-century American male musicians